West End is a ward of the London borough of the City of Westminster, in the United Kingdom. The ward has existed since elections to Westminster City Council that took place on 4 May 1978. It is named after the West End of London, which covers a wider area. While it has a resident population of about 7,000, its daytime population is around 250,000 due to the high number of businesses in the area.

Summary
Councillors elected by party at each general borough election.

1978–2002
The ward of West End was created for the 1978 London borough council elections, returning two councillors. It was part of the City of London and Westminster South constituency.

From 2002
There was a revision of ward boundaries in Westminster in 2002.

For elections to Parliament, West End is part of the Cities of London and Westminster constituency.

It lies in the east of the borough, and its boundaries broadly cover the neighbourhoods of Mayfair and Soho, the southern part of Fitzrovia, and the south-eastern corner of Marylebone. The boundary to the south with St James's ward is Shaftesbury Avenue, Piccadilly, and Hyde Park Corner. The boundary to the west with Knightsbridge & Belgravia ward is Park Lane. The boundary to the north with Bryanston and Dorset Square ward is Oxford Street and with Marylebone High Street ward is Oxford Street, Vere Street, Henrietta Place, Cavendish Square, Harley Street, and New Cavendish Street. The boundary with the London Borough of Camden is Cleveland Street, Goodge Street, Charlotte Place, Rathbone Street, Charlotte Street, Rathbone Place, Gresse Street, Hanway Street, Tottenham Court Road and Charing Cross Road.

Like all other wards of Westminster, West End is represented by three councillors on Westminster City Council. The last election was held on 5 May 2022, when all three councillors were elected. Since the ward's creation, all representatives had been elected for the Conservative Party; however, in 2018, the Labour Party gained its first councillor and four years later, in 2022, another two councillors from the Labour Party were elected. The ward is thus currently entirely represented by Labour members.

Notable former councillors for the ward include Nicholas Boles, MP for Grantham and Stamford (2010 to 2019) and journalist Glenys Roberts.

2002 election

2006 election

2010 election

2014 election

2018 election

2022 election

References

External links

 Full election results since 1978

1978 establishments in England
Wards in the City of Westminster